"Oak Ridge atomic plant" may refer to one of several different facilities in Oak Ridge, Tennessee, including:
Oak Ridge National Laboratory
K-25
S-50 (Manhattan Project)
Y-12 National Security Complex